The 2012 Regional Women's Twenty20 Championship was the inaugural season of the women's Twenty20 cricket competition played in the West Indies. It took place in August 2012, with 8 teams taking part and all matches taking place in Jamaica. Jamaica won the tournament, beating Trinidad and Tobago in the final.

Competition format 
The teams played in a round-robin group of eight, therefore playing seven matches. Matches were played using a Twenty20 format. The top two teams in each group progressed to the final, whilst the other teams competed in 3rd, 5th and 7th-place play-offs.

The group worked on a points system with positions being based on the total points. Points were awarded as follows:

Win: 5 points 
Loss: 0 points.
Abandoned/No Result: 1 point.

Points table

Source: Windies Cricket

Play-offs

3rd-place play-off

5th-place play-off

7th-place play-off

Final

Statistics

Most runs

Source: CricketArchive

Most wickets

Source: CricketArchive

References

External links
 Series home at Windies Cricket

Twenty20 Blaze
2012 in West Indian cricket